Carl Mauck (born July 7, 1947) is a former American football player and coach who was a center who played 13 seasons in the National Football League (NFL) for four teams and later served as an offensive line coach for several teams. Mauck attended Southern Illinois University.

Early life and college career
Mauck was born July 7, 1947 in McLeansboro, Illinois. He prepped at McLeansboro Township High School before earning a scholarship to Southern Illinois University, where he played center and linebacker. He also played basketball as a freshman, lining up alongside future National Basketball Association (NBA) great Walt Frazier.

Mauck graduated from Southern Illinois in 1969 with a degree in business management.

NFL playing career
Mauck's playing career in the National Football League (NFL) spanned 13 seasons, from 1969 to 1981. He played in 166 career regular-season games, including a stretch of 156 in a row. He also played in eight career playoff games, including back-to-back AFC Championship Games for Houston in 1978 and 1979.

Mauck's NFL career started with the Baltimore Colts in 1969 and the Miami Dolphins in 1970. He spent the 1971 through 1974 seasons with the San Diego Chargers before finishing his career with the Houston Oilers, from 1975 to 1981. Wade Phillips was an assistant coach with the Oilers during Mauck's playing tenure, and his father, Bum Phillips, was the head coach. Bum Phillips was also an assistant coach in San Diego when Mauck played for the Chargers. Mauck later coached on Wade Phillips' staff in Buffalo.

Coaching career
Mauck's first NFL coaching stint was with the New Orleans Saints from 1982 to 1985. He then served with the Kansas City Chiefs (1986–1988), Tampa Bay Buccaneers (1991), San Diego Chargers (1992–1995), Arizona Cardinals (1996–97), Buffalo Bills (1998–2000), and  Detroit Lions (2001–2003).  He returned to the Chargers in 2005.  During his first stint in San Diego, the Chargers appeared in the playoffs following three of those four seasons, including Super Bowl XXIX following the 1994 season.  During his last two seasons in Detroit, the Lions allowed the fewest sacks in the NFL, surrendering 20 sacks in 2002 and only 11 in 2003.

Honors
Mauck was enshrined in the Saluki Hall of Fame in 1979.  In 2010 he was elected by the NFLAlumni to represent Advocacy for Retired NFL Players.  In 2011 Mauck's hometown of McLeansboro, Illinois named their football field after him. Mauck was selected to SIU Saluki Football All-Century Team in 2013.  In 2017, he received the Gerald R. Ford Legends Award  named for Gerald Ford, the 38th President of the United States.
The award is presented at the Rimington Trophy banquet to former collegiate or professional centers who, in addition to standout football careers, have also made significant contributions to the football and/or business communities, or through philanthropic endeavor.  In 2017 Mauck was enshired in the St. Louis Sports Hall of Fame Illinois.

Family
Mauck and his wife, Vicki, have four children, Tim, Chrissy, Teresa and Cathy.

References

External links
 

1947 births
Living people
People from McLeansboro, Illinois
Players of American football from Illinois
American football centers
Southern Illinois Salukis football players
Baltimore Colts players
Miami Dolphins players
San Diego Chargers players
Houston Oilers players
Coaches of American football from Illinois
New Orleans Saints coaches
Kansas City Chiefs coaches
Tampa Bay Buccaneers coaches
San Diego Chargers coaches
Arizona Cardinals coaches
Buffalo Bills coaches
Detroit Lions coaches
Southern Illinois Salukis football coaches